Thomas Patten may refer to:
Thomas G. Patten (1861–1939), U.S. Representative from New York
Thomas Patten (socialist) (1910–1936), Irish combatant in the Spanish Civil War
Thomas Diery Patten (1926–1999), Scottish engineer

See also
Thomas Paton (disambiguation)